{{Infobox legislature
| name               = National Assembly of Quebec 
| native_name        = Assemblée nationale du Québec
| native_name_lang   = fr
| coa-pic            = Assemblée nationale du Québec 1.svg
| coa-res            = 250px
| legislature        = 43rd Quebec Legislature
| session_room       = National Assembly of Quebec 03.jpg
| house_type         = Unicameral house
| body               = Quebec Legislature
| foundation         = 
| preceded_by        = Legislative Assembly of Quebec
| leader2_type       = President
| leader2            = Nathalie Roy
| party2             =
| election2          = November 29, 2022
| leader3_type       = Premier
| leader3            = François Legault
| party3             = CAQ
| election3          = October 18, 2018
| leader4_type       = Government House Leader
| leader4            = Simon Jolin-Barrette
| party4             = CAQ
| election4          = October 18, 2018
| leader5_type       = Opposition Leader
| leader5            = Marc Tanguay (interim)
| party5             = PLQ
| election5          = November 10, 2022
| leader6_type       = Opposition House Leader
| leader6            = Marc Tanguay
| party6             = PLQ
| election6          = September 5, 2019
| members            = 125 members of Assembly
| structure1         = Assemblée nationale du Québec 14-08-2022.png
| structure1_res     = 250px
| political_groups1  = 
Government of Quebec
 
Official Opposition
 
Parties with official status
 
Parties without official status
 
  Independent (2)

| last_election1     = October 3, 2022
| next_election1     = On or before October 5, 2026
| voting_system1     = First-past-the-post
| meeting_place      = Parliament Building, Quebec City, Quebec
| website            = 
}}
The National Assembly of Quebec (officially in ) is the legislative body of the province of Quebec in Canada. Legislators are called MNAs (Members of the National Assembly). The King in Right of Quebec, represented by the lieutenant governor of Quebec and the National Assembly compose the Legislature of Quebec, which operates in a fashion similar to those of other Westminster-style parliamentary systems. The assembly has 125 members elected first past the post from single-member districts.

The National Assembly was formerly the lower house of Quebec's legislature and was then called the Legislative Assembly of Quebec. In 1968, the upper house, the Legislative Council, was abolished and the remaining house was renamed. The office of President of the National Assembly is equivalent to speaker in other legislatures. As of the 2022 Quebec general election, Coalition Avenir Québec has the most seats in the Assembly.

 History 

The Constitutional Act 1791 created the Parliament of Lower Canada.  It consisted of two chambers, the Legislative Council and the Legislative Assembly. That parliament and both chambers were abolished in 1841 when the 1840 Act of Union merged Upper Canada and Lower Canada into a single province named the Province of Canada.  The Act of Union created a new Parliament of the Province of Canada, also composed of a Legislative Council and a Legislative Assembly.  That Parliament had jurisdiction over the entire province, with members from Lower Canada and Upper Canada in both houses.

The Constitution Act, 1867 (formerly known as the British North America Act), created the Dominion of Canada, and also created the provinces of Ontario and Quebec by splitting the old Province of Canada into two, based on the old boundaries of Lower Canada and Upper Canada. The act created a new bicameral Legislature for the province of Quebec, composed of the Legislative Council and the Legislative Assembly of Quebec.

In 1961, Marie-Claire Kirkland became the first woman elected to the Legislative Assembly.

In 1968, Bill 90 was passed by the government of Premier Jean-Jacques Bertrand, abolishing the Legislative Council and renaming the Legislative Assembly the "National Assembly", in line with the more strident nationalism of the Quiet Revolution. Before 1968, there had been various unsuccessful attempts at abolishing the Legislative Council, which was analogous to the Senate of Canada.

In 1978, television cameras were brought in for the first time to televise parliamentary debates.

In 1984, Canadian Forces corporal Denis Lortie stormed into the Parliament Building and opened fire, killing three government employees and wounding thirteen others. His intended target was Premier René Lévesque and his Parti Québécois government, however he was around 15 minutes early and the Assembly floor was still mostly empty; no politicians were shot. He surrendered to police hours later.

Parliament Building

Constructed between 1877 and 1886, the Parliament Building features the Second Empire architectural style that was popular for prestigious buildings both in Europe (especially France where the style originated) and the United States during the latter 19th century.

Although somewhat more sober in appearance and lacking a towering central belfry, Quebec City's Parliament Building bears a definite likeness to the Philadelphia City Hall, another Second Empire edifice in North America which was built during the same period. Even though the building's symmetrical layout with a frontal clock tower in the middle is typical of legislative institutions of British heritage, the architectural style is believed to be unique among parliament buildings found in other Canadian provincial capitals. Its façade presents a pantheon representing significant events and people of the history of Quebec.

In 1936, Maurice Duplessis hung a crucifix in the Legislative Assembly chamber. It hung there for 83 years, until it was removed on 10 July 2019.

Additional buildings were added, adjacent to the Parliament Buildings:

 Édifice André-Laurendeau was added from 1935 to 1937 to house the Ministry of Transport.
  was added from 1922 to 1925 to house the Ministries of the Treasury (Finance), the Attorney General and the Secretary General of the National Assembly.
 Édifice Jean-Antoine-Panet was added from 1931 to 1932 for the Ministry of Agriculture.
  added from 1910 to 1915 for the Library of the National Assembly, various other government offices and for the Executive Council.

 Elections 
General elections are held every four years or less. Since 2014, the legislature has had a fixed four-year term, with elections taking place no later than "the first Monday of October of the fourth calendar year following the year that includes the last day of the previous Legislature." However, the lieutenant governor, acting on the advice of the premier, can dissolve the legislature and call an election earlier. Any Canadian citizen at least 18 years old who has been residing in Quebec for at least six months qualifies to be on the electoral list.

Normally, the lieutenant governor invites the leader of the political party with the largest number of elected candidates to form the government as premier ( in French; French does not make a distinction between premier and prime minister).

Quebec's territory is divided into 125 electoral districts (ridings). In each riding, the candidate who receives the most votes is elected and becomes a member of the National Assembly (MNA). This is the first-past-the-post voting system. It tends to produce strong disparities in the number of seats won compared to the popular vote, perhaps best exemplified by the 1966 (wrong-winner result), 1970 (false-majority result), 1973, and 1998 election (wrong-winner and false-majority result).

Quebec elections have also tended to be volatile since the 1970s, producing a large turnover in seats. Consequently, existing political parties often lose more than half their seats with the rise of new or opposition political parties. For instance, the 1970 and 1973 saw the demise of the Union Nationale and rise of the Parti Québécois, which took power in 1976. The 1985 and 1994 elections saw the Liberals gain and lose power in landslide elections. The 2018 elections saw the rise of the Coalition Avenir Québec, which took power for the first time.

 Members 
 Current standings 

Cabinet ministers are in bold, party leaders are in italic and the president of the National Assembly is marked with a †.

{| class="wikitable sortable"
! class=unsortable|
! Name
! Party
! Riding

| 
| CAQ
| Abitibi-Est

| 
| CAQ
| Abitibi-Ouest

| 
| Liberal
| Acadie

| 
| CAQ
| Anjou–Louis-Riel

| 
| CAQ
| Argenteuil

| | CAQ
| Arthabaska

| 
| CAQ
| Beauce-Nord

| 
| CAQ
| Beauce-Sud

| 
| CAQ
| Beauharnois

| 
| CAQ
| Bellechasse

| | CAQ
| Berthier

| | CAQ
| Bertrand

| | CAQ
| Blainville

|
| CAQ
|Bonaventure

| | CAQ
| Borduas

| 
| Liberal
| Bourassa-Sauvé

| | CAQ
| Brome-Missisquoi

| | PQ
| Camille-Laurin

| 
| CAQ
| Chambly

| 
| CAQ
| Champlain

| 
| CAQ
| Chapleau

| 
| CAQ
| Charlesbourg

| 
| CAQ
| Charlevoix–Côte-de-Beaupré

| 
| CAQ
| Châteauguay

| 
| CAQ
| Chauveau

| 
| CAQ
| Chicoutimi

|
|Liberal
|Chomedey

| 
| CAQ
| Chutes-de-la-Chaudière

| 
| CAQ
| Côte-du-Sud

| 
| Liberal
| D'Arcy-McGee

| 
| CAQ
| Deux-Montagnes

| 
| CAQ
| Drummond–Bois-Francs

| 
| CAQ
| Dubuc

| 
| CAQ
| Duplessis

| 
| Liberal
| Fabre

|
|CAQ
| Gaspé

| 
| CAQ
| Gatineau

| | QS
| Gouin

| 
| CAQ
| Granby

| 
| CAQ
| Groulx

| 
| QS
| Hochelaga-Maisonneuve

| 
| CAQ
| Hull

| 
| CAQ
| Huntingdon

|
| CAQ
|Iberville

| 
| PQ
| Îles-de-la-Madeleine

|| 
| Liberal
| Jacques-Cartier

| 
| QS
| Jean-Lesage

| 
| Liberal
| Jeanne-Mance–Viger

| 
| CAQ
| Jean-Talon

| 
| CAQ
| Johnson

| 
| CAQ
| Joliette

| 
| CAQ
| Jonquière

| 
| CAQ
| Labelle

|| 
| CAQ
| Lac-Saint-Jean

| | Liberal
| LaFontaine

| 
| CAQ
| La Peltrie

| 
| Liberal
| La Pinière

| 
| Liberal
| Laporte

| 
| CAQ
| La Prairie

| | CAQ
| L'Assomption

| 
| QS
| Laurier-Dorion

| 
| CAQ
| Laval-des-Rapides

|rowspan=2|
| CAQ
|rowspan=2|Laviolette–Saint-Maurice

| Independent

| 
| CAQ
| Les Plaines

| | CAQ
| Lévis

| 
| CAQ
| Lotbinière-Frontenac

| | CAQ
| Louis-Hébert

| 
| Liberal
| Marguerite-Bourgeoys

|
| CAQ
|Marie-Victorin

| 
| Liberal
| Marquette

| 
| CAQ
| Maskinongé

| 
| CAQ
| Masson

| 
| PQ
| Matane-Matapédia

| 
| QS
| Maurice-Richard

| 
| CAQ
| Mégantic

| 
| QS
| Mercier

| 
| Liberal
| Mille-Îles

| 
| CAQ
| Mirabel

|| 
| CAQ
| Montarville

| 
| CAQ
| Montmorency

| 
| Liberal
| Mont-Royal–Outremont

| 
| Liberal
| Nelligan

| 
| CAQ
| Nicolet-Bécancour

| 
| Liberal
| Notre-Dame-de-Grâce

| 
| CAQ
| Orford

| | CAQ
| Papineau

| | CAQ
| Pointe-aux-Trembles

| 
| Liberal
| Pontiac

| 
| CAQ
| Portneuf

| | CAQ
| Prévost

| 
| CAQ
| René-Lévesque

| | CAQ
| Repentigny

| 
| CAQ
| Richelieu

| 
| CAQ
| Richmond

|| CAQ
|Rimouski

|
| CAQ
|Rivière-du-Loup–Témiscouata

| 
| Liberal
| Robert-Baldwin

| 
| CAQ
| Roberval

| 
| QS
| Rosemont

|
| CAQ
|Rousseau

| 
| CAQ
| Rouyn-Noranda–Témiscamingue

| 
| CAQ
| Saint-François

| (until Dec. 1, 2022)
| Liberal
| rowspan="2"| Saint-Henri–Sainte-Anne

| (since Mar. 13, 2023)
| QS

| 
| CAQ
| Saint-Hyacinthe

| 
| CAQ
| Saint-Jean

| 
| CAQ
| Saint-Jérôme

| 
| Liberal
| Saint-Laurent

|| 
| QS
| Sainte-Marie–Saint-Jacques

| | CAQ
| Sainte-Rose

| | CAQ
| Sanguinet

| 
| QS
| Sherbrooke

| 
| CAQ
| Soulanges

| | CAQ
| Taillon

| 
| QS
| Taschereau

| | CAQ
| Terrebonne

| | CAQ
| Trois-Rivières

| 
| CAQ
| Ungava

| | CAQ
| Vachon

| 
| CAQ
| Vanier-Les Rivières

|rowspan=2|
| Liberal
|rowspan=2|Vaudreuil

| Independent

| '''
| CAQ
| Verchères

| 
| QS
| Verdun

| 
| Liberal
| Viau

| 
| CAQ
| Vimont

| 
| Liberal
| Westmount–Saint-Louis
|}

 Seating plan 

Most recent election

 Changes during the 43rd Quebec Legislature 

 Proceedings 
One of the members of the National Assembly is elected as President of the Assembly (a post called speaker in most other Westminster System assemblies).  Any member of the assembly is eligible to stand for election, other than party leaders and Cabinet ministers.  The election is the first order of business for a newly elected assembly.  It is conducted by secret ballot of all members, with successive rounds of voting if needed before one candidate gains a majority of the votes.

The president of the assembly is the arbiter of the parliamentary debates between the members of the government and the members of the Opposition. In order for a member to address the assembly, the member speak through the president. The president is usually a member of the governing party.

The proceedings of the National Assembly are broadcast across Quebec on the cable television network Canal de l'Assemblée nationale.

 See also 
 Executive Council of Quebec
 List of Quebec general elections
 List of Quebec premiers
 List of Quebec leaders of the Opposition
 Politics of Quebec
 Timeline of Quebec history

 References 

 Notes 

 Citations 

 Bibliography 
 Assemblé nationale du Québec (2000). What is the National Assembly?, Québec: Assemblée nationale, 58 p.
 Deschênes, Gaston (1983). The Assemblée nationale: Its Organization and Parliamentary Procedure'', Québec: Assemblée nationale, 53 p. [1st ed. in 1977]

External links 
 National Assembly of Quebec website
 National Assembly historical data 
 Diagram of the positions in the Assembly 
 Data about the current president of the Assembly

Quebec Legislature
Legislatures of Canadian provinces and territories
Unicameral legislatures